"Turn the Tide" is the debut single by Belgian vocal trance and Europop group Sylver. The song was produced in Belgium by Little Major Productions. In Belgium, it was released under the artist name Liquid featuring Silvy. The song is included on the group's debut album Chances and in French as "Je ne sais pas" as part of their second album Little Things as a ghost track at the end of the album.

Track list
1. "Turn the Tide" (radio edit) (4:06)
2. "Turn the Tide" (CJ Stone radio edit) (3:28)
3. "Turn the Tide" (the original mix) (8:01)
4. "Turn the Tide" (Airscape remix) (7:25)
5. "Turn the Tide" (CJ Stone remix) (7:34)

Credits
Artwork – VM2 DTP
Photography – Maak Roberts
Songwriter, producer – Regi Penxten, Wout Van Dessel
Vocals – Silvy De Bie

Charts

Weekly charts

Liquid feat. Silvy

Year-end charts

Liquid feat. Silvy

References

2000 debut singles
2001 singles
Sylver songs
2000 songs